Weights & Wings is a studio album from singer-songwriter Matt Wertz. It was released on March 15, 2011 by both Handwritten Records and Nettwerk Music Group, and it was produced by Brandon Hood and Jason Lehning. The album charted at No. 56 on The Billboard 200.

Background
The album is the successor to Under Summer Sun that was released in 2008.

Critical reception

Weights & Wings garnered generally positive reviews from the ratings and reviews of music critics. At CCM Magazine, Grace S. Aspinwall rated the album four stars out of five, remarking how Wertz "produced another flawless album" and the release "is a clean, cheerful project brimming with brilliant love songs" that are "Smooth. Romantic. Timeless." William Ruhlmann of AllMusic rated the album three stars out of five, indicating that "pop singers like Matt Wertz are needed, and with any luck he'll have his moment of vicariously answering the needs of the audience he seeks and selling some downloads by doing so." At Melodic, Rickard Holmgren rated the album three-and-a-half stars out of five, writing that "Matt Wertz delivers once again an album of high quality, the production fits the songs and you get both slow and up-tempo songs", and this is why it "could be the prefect soundtrack for the summer!" BMer of Indie Vision Music rated the album four stars out of five, stating that "Combining Matt's solid lyrics, his vulnerability and honesty, with his talent in song writing creates yet another solid album."

Chart performance
For the Billboard charting week of April 2, 2011, Weights & Wings was No. 56 on the Billboard 200 albums chart, No. 11 on the Top Rock Albums chart. The album also reached No. 8 on both the Independent Albums and Digital Albums charts.

Track listing

Charts

References

2011 albums
Matt Wertz albums
Alternative rock albums by American artists
Indie rock albums by American artists
Indie pop albums by American artists